Saryqobda (Saryqobda) is an aul in the Aktobe Region of Kazakhstan. It was known until 1993 as Bessarabka (Bessarabka). Together with the village of Moldavanka, it one of the two villages founded by Bessarabians immigrants at the beginning of the 20th century in Kazakhstan.

See also
 Romanians in Kazakhstan

References

Populated places in Aktobe Region